Lo Mejor is a compilation album by Grupo Niche, released in 1998 on Caiman. All songs were written by Jairo Varela.

Track list
Del Puente Pa'Lla
La Fiera
Mama Chila
Ana Milé
Listo Medellin
Interes Cuanto Vales
Las Flores Tambien Se Mueren
Cicatrices

References

Mejor, Lo
Grupo Niche compilation albums
Spanish-language compilation albums